Hyperepia is a monotypic moth genus of the family Noctuidae erected by William Barnes and Arthur Ward Lindsey in 1922. Its only species, Hyperepia jugifera, was first described by Harrison Gray Dyar Jr. in 1920. It is found in North America.

The MONA or Hodges number for Hyperepia jugifera is 10576.

References

Further reading

 
 
 
 
 
 
 
 
 

Eriopygini
Articles created by Qbugbot
Moths described in 1920
Monotypic moth genera